Nikola Antić (born 4 January 1994) is a Serbian football defender who plays for Russian club FC Khimki.

Club career
Antić played for Partizan in youth categories, but he signed his first professional contract with Rad. He was one season at loan with Palić.

In August 2014, he signed a four-year contract with Red Star Belgrade. He played only one game with Red Star in Jelen Super Liga. In February 2015, he terminated his contract with the club and signed with Jagodina.

On 31 August 2015, Antić signed a three-year-deal with Vojvodina. In January 2018, Antić extended his contract with club, signing a one-year extension.

On 3 February 2019, Nikola Antić left Vojvodina and signed for Belarusian club Shakhtyor Soligorsk.

On 10 February 2023, Antić signed a year-and-a-half contract with Russian Premier League club FC Khimki.

Career statistics

References

External links
 Profile on Srbijafudbal.net
 
 
 Stats at Utakmica.rs

1994 births
Footballers from Belgrade
Living people
Serbian footballers
Serbia youth international footballers
Serbia under-21 international footballers
Association football defenders
FK Rad players
FK Palić players
Red Star Belgrade footballers
FK Jagodina players
FK Vojvodina players
FC Shakhtyor Soligorsk players
FC Khimki players
Serbian SuperLiga players
Belarusian Premier League players
Russian Premier League players
Serbian expatriate footballers
Expatriate footballers in Belarus
Serbian expatriate sportspeople in Belarus
Expatriate footballers in Russia
Serbian expatriate sportspeople in Russia